Unique Master Citizen Number (JMBG / ЈМБГ, EMŠO) is an identification number that was assigned to every citizen of former Yugoslav republics of the SFR Yugoslavia. It continues to be used in almost all of the countries that were created after the dissolution of Yugoslavia – Bosnia and Herzegovina, Montenegro, North Macedonia, Serbia and Slovenia use it in its original form, while Croatia has switched to a new identification number called the Personal Identification Number (OIB).

History

The JMBG was introduced in the Socialist Federal Republic of Yugoslavia on January 8, 1977 and applied to all citizens born before then and alive at the time. All six republics passed a law on the Unique Master Citizen Number.

Although the Republic of Croatia continued to use the JMBG after gaining independence in 2002 the official name of the number there was changed to Matični broj građana (Master Citizen Number), acronym MBG. Advocates of the right to privacy argued that JMBG was a piece of personally identifiable information that needed to be protected by information privacy law, mostly because it was unique and it included the person's date of birth. When the law to that effect was passed in 2003 it was no longer possible to use JMBG on identity cards, driver's licenses and similar documents. Even though law hid MBG from personal documents, various institutions (e.g. banks, schools, insurance companies ...) continued to demand citizens to  give their MBG while signing various contracts, since MBG was natural unique identifier of each citizen. Seeing flaw of hiding MBG, on January 1, 2009 Croatia passed a new law that introduced a different unique identifier called the Personal Identification Number (OIB). The OIB consists of 11 randomly chosen digits and has been assigned to all Croatian citizens, companies registered in Croatia and foreign nationals residing in Croatia. Although the OIB is in use, the MBG law remains in effect, and the MBG number is still issued. It is used for data coordination among government registries. MBG no longer appears on Croatian identity cards since 2003, instead OIB does, since 2013.

In Bosnia and Herzegovina in 2001 the official name of the number was changed to Jedinstveni matični broj (Unique Master Number), although acronym JMBG is still in use.

Composition 

The number is made up of 13 digits in a form "DD MM YYY RR BBB K" (whitespaces are for convenience; digits are written without separation) where:
 DD – day of birth

 MM – month of birth

 YYY – last three digits of the year of birth

 RR – political region  of birth (for persons born before 1976, political region where they were first registered)
 01-08 – foreign citizens  without citizenship of former Yugoslavia or succeeding countries (foreign citizens that receive citizenship also receive a 'regular' JMBG, not this 'foreigners only' one)
 01 – foreigners in Bosnia and Herzegovina
 02 – foreigners in Montenegro
 03 – foreigners in Croatia
 04 – foreigners in Macedonia
 05 – foreigners in Slovenia
 06 – foreigners in Central Serbia
 07 – foreigners in Vojvodina
 08 – foreigners in Kosovo
00 and 09 – naturalized citizens which had no republican citizenship
 10–19 – Bosnia and Herzegovina
 10 – Banja Luka
 11 – Bihać
 12 – Doboj
 13 – Goražde
 14 – Livno
 15 – Mostar
 16 – Prijedor
 17 – Sarajevo
 18 – Tuzla
 19 – Zenica

 20–29 – Montenegro
 20 – (not in use)
 21 – Podgorica, Danilovgrad, Kolašin
 22 – Bar, Ulcinj
 23 – Budva, Kotor, Tivat
 24 – Herceg Novi
 25 – Cetinje
 26 – Nikšić, Plužine, Šavnik
 27 – Berane, Rožaje, Plav, Andrijevica
 28 – Bijelo Polje, Mojkovac
 29 – Pljevlja, Žabljak

 30–39 – Croatia (no longer exclusively used)
 30 – Osijek, Slavonia region
 31 – Bjelovar, Virovitica, Koprivnica, Pakrac, Podravina region
 32 – Varaždin, Međimurje region
 33 – Zagreb
 34 – Karlovac, Kordun region
 35 – Gospić, Lika region
 36 – Rijeka, Pula, Gorski kotar, Istria and Croatian Littoral regions
 37 – Sisak, Banovina region
 38 – Split, Zadar, Šibenik, Dubrovnik, Dalmatia region
 39 – Hrvatsko Zagorje and mixed
 41–49 – Macedonia
 41 – Bitola
 42 – Kumanovo
 43 – Ohrid
 44 – Prilep
 45 – Skopje
 46 – Strumica
 47 – Tetovo
 48 – Veles
 49 – Štip

 50–59 – Slovenia (only 50 is used)
 60–69 – (Citizens with temporary residence)

 70–79 – Central Serbia
 70 – Serbian citizens registered abroad at a Serbian diplomatic/consular post (section 4 of the JMBG Law)
 71 – Belgrade region (City of Belgrade)
 72 – Šumadija and Pomoravlje regions (Šumadija District and Pomoravlje District)
 73 – Niš region (Nišava District, Pirot District and Toplica District)
 74 – Southern Morava region (Jablanica District and Pčinja District)
 75 – Zaječar region (Zaječar District and Bor District)
 76 – Podunavlje region (Podunavlje District and Braničevo District)
 77 – Podrinje and Kolubara regions (Mačva District and Kolubara District)
 78 – Kraljevo region (Raška District, Moravica District and Rasina District)
 79 – Užice region (Zlatibor District)

 80–89 – Serbian province of Vojvodina
 80 – Novi Sad region (South Bačka District)
 81 – Sombor region (West Bačka District)
 82 – Subotica region (North Bačka District)
 84 – Kikinda region (North Banat District)
 85 – Zrenjanin region (Central Banat District)
 86 – Pančevo region (South Banat District)
 87 – Vršac region (South Banat District)
 88 – Ruma region (part of Syrmia District)
 89 – Sremska Mitrovica region (part of Syrmia District)

 90–99 – Serbian province of Kosovo
 91 – Priština region (Kosovo District)
 92 – Kosovska Mitrovica region (Kosovska Mitrovica District)
 93 – Peć region (part of Peć District)
 94 – Đakovica region (part of Peć District)
 95 – Prizren region (Prizren District)
 96 – Gnjilane region (Kosovo-Pomoravlje District)

 BBB – unique number of the particular RR (represents a person within the DDMMYYYRR section in the particular municipality)
 000–499 – male
 500–999 – female

 K – checksum

Checksum calculation

The checksum is calculated from the mapping  = , using the formula:
m = 11 − (( 7×(a + g) + 6×(b + h) + 5×(c + i) + 4×(d + j) + 3×(e + k) + 2×(f + l) ) mod 11)

 If m is between 1 and 9, the number K is the same as the number m
 If m is 10 or 11 K becomes 0 (zero)

Note: there has been a small number of JMBGs that were assigned by valid authorities but which had an invalid checksum. Also, there are a few duplicate JMBGs in existence. The common anecdotal explanation for these is simple operator error. Reportedly these mistakes happened more often in the early 1990s. The chances of running into exceptions are reportedly low, and whether such exceptions justify questioning the use of JMBG as a unique identifier has not been scientifically analyzed.

Example

As an example, a valid identification number is 0101006500006; it is the number of the first male baby registered in Slovenia on January 1, 2006.

See also
National identification number

References

External links
Online validation checking and details of Unique Master Citizen Number

1977 introductions
Socialist Federal Republic of Yugoslavia
National identification numbers
Law of Serbia
Law of Slovenia
Law of Bosnia and Herzegovina
Law of Montenegro
Law of North Macedonia
Law of Croatia